The 2022 Balkan Athletics Championships was the 75th edition of the annual track and field competition for athletes from the Balkans, organised by Balkan Athletics. It was held on 18 and 19 June at the Nicolae Mărășescu Athletics Stadium in Craiova, Romania.

Medal summary

Men

Women

Medal table

References

Results
Live results
Official results
Results at World Athletics
Results at Tilastopaja

External links
Balkan Athletics website

2022
Balkan Athletics Championships
Balkan Athletics Championships
International athletics competitions hosted by Romania
Sport in Craiova